Down to Earth is an American fantasy sitcom series that ran on Superstation WTBS from March 10, 1984 to 1987. The series was originally produced by The Arthur Company, and later, by Procter & Gamble Productions and was the Superstation's first original series.

Premise
The series revolved around Ethel MacDoogan (Carol Mansell), a free-spirited woman who lived the "Roaring 1920s" era. However, in 1925 she suffered a fatal accident, colliding with a trolley. Ethel waits in Heaven for 60 years for a chance to earn her wings, until finally she is sent to earth in the 1980s to help the Preston family.

The Prestons are a typical modern-day American family with modern-day situations: widowed father Richard (Stephen Johnson, then Dick Sargent) is a realtor, though he retired a few months after and began working as a licensing agent for new inventors; older son Duane (David Kaufman) is very class-conscious; teenage daughter Lissy (Kyle Richards) is very opinionated; Jay Jay (Randy Josselyn), the youngest, just wants someone who can fill their late mother's void. It is Jay Jay's prayer for an angel to come into their lives that summons Ethel, and he is the only one who knows her true identity.

Infiltrating the household as housekeeper and maid, Ethel is unsurprisingly clueless about even the simplest conveniences of modern-day 1980s family life. Jay Jay helps cover for her when it comes to adapting to the newfangled inventions of the past 60 years, and she eventually wins over the Prestons by successfully helping them deal with their problems.

Popping in from time to time is the Prestons' ditsy next-door neighbor Candy Carlysle (Marla Rubinoff), who became a regular character in 1985.

In addition to her earthly employer, Ethel is under the constant eye of her heavenly boss and their successors, who watch her every move—and her every mistake. Her first overseer, Mr. Divine (Lester Fletcher), kept a close eye on her. He was moved to another position in Heaven a few months after, and the very concerned but comical Lester Luster (Ronnie Schell) took over, followed by her ex-fiancé/con-man Jake (Michael DeLano), with the outrageous Stanley McCloud (Rip Taylor) taking over in the show's final years.

A few months after the show's beginning, a turning point occurred: Ethel's mission on Earth proved successful and she was ordered back to Heaven. Realizing how much the Prestons meant to her and vice versa, she begged Lester Luster to postpone her return to Heaven. Together, they created a deal that she would help him with any crises on Earth that he brought to her attention and that she would have to return to Heaven if she was unsuccessful.

Production notes
The series made several changes to its cast. Besides the ethereal bosses, it changed the earthly father as well, becoming the second series in which Dick Sargent replaced another actor in the same role.

The show's central characters were jointly created, and the core format was jointly developed, by Sam Harris, who collaborated with Arthur L. Annecharico to do so. Harris also wrote several episodes of the show.

In addition to having run on WTBS, Down to Earth also had subsequent runs on Good Life TV.

Reception
The Ocala Star-Banner called Down to Earth "one of the better sitcoms on the air nowadays".

Cast

Episodes

Season 1 (1984)

Season 2 (1984–85)

Season 3 (1985)

Season 4

Season 5 (1986)

Season 6 (1986)

Season 7 (1987)

Crew
Executive Producer: Arthur Annecharico
Producer: Rick Miner

References

External links
 
"Down to Earth" at RetroJunk, including opening credits video

1984 American television series debuts
1987 American television series endings
1980s American sitcoms
American fantasy television series
Television series about ghosts
Television series about families
Television series by Procter & Gamble Productions
TBS (American TV channel) original programming
English-language television shows
Angels in television